El Segundo station is an elevated light rail station on the C Line of the Los Angeles Metro Rail system. It is located over El Segundo Boulevard, after which the station is named, near its intersection with Nash Street in El Segundo, California.

The station is located on a corner of the Raytheon Intelligence & Space campus and is close to the Los Angeles Air Force Base, The Aerospace Corporation campus, and the future training facility for the Los Angeles Chargers.

The original name for the station was El Segundo Blvd/Nash St, but was later simplified to just El Segundo.

The train platform, currently suitable for two-car trains, may be lengthened to accommodate three-car trains to enable increased capacity of the line.

Service

Station layout

Hours and frequency

Connections 
, the following connections are available:
 LADOT Commuter Express: 
 Torrance Transit: 8

Notable places nearby 
The station is within walking distance of the following notable places:
 The Aerospace Corporation campus
 Los Angeles Air Force Base
 Raytheon Intelligence & Space campus

References 

C Line (Los Angeles Metro) stations
El Segundo, California
1995 establishments in California
Railway stations in the United States opened in 1995